Quadragesima may refer to:

 Lent, the Christian period of fasting, prayer and almsgiving
 Quadragesima Sunday